Leandro Rodrigo Collavini (born 14 December 1985) is an Argentine professional footballer who plays as a defender for Deportivo Riestra.

Career
Collavini's career began with Talleres of Remedios de Escalada. His spell with the club lasted four seasons from the 2005–06 campaign, with the defender appearing seventy-three times and scoring seven goals; six occurred during 2008–09, which included a brace over Central Córdoba in February 2009. In the succeeding July, after suffering relegation with Talleres, Collavini remained in the division after agreeing terms with Tristán Suárez. He scored nine goals across three seasons with the third tier side. Collavini spent the 2012–13 campaign in Primera B Nacional with Atlético Tucumán, scoring one goal across fifteen encounters.

Collavini returned to Primera B Metropolitana in June 2013, subsequently having stints across the following two years with Atlanta and Almirante Brown. January 2016 saw Collavini sign for Deportivo Riestra. Fifteen appearances followed in two seasons, with the team earning promotion to Primera B Nacional in 2016–17. His first appearance for them in the second tier arrived on 11 December 2017 versus Santamarina, in a season that saw them relegated back to tier three.

Career statistics
.

References

External links

1985 births
Living people
Sportspeople from Lanús
Argentine footballers
Association football defenders
Primera B Metropolitana players
Primera Nacional players
Talleres de Remedios de Escalada footballers
CSyD Tristán Suárez footballers
Atlético Tucumán footballers
Club Atlético Atlanta footballers
Club Almirante Brown footballers
Deportivo Riestra players